Rugogastridae is a family of trematodes in the order Aspidogastrida. It consists of a single genus, Rugogaster Schell, 1973.

Species
Rugogaster callorhinci Amato & Pereira, 1995
Rugogaster hydrolagi Schell, 1973

Morphological characteristics
Species of Rugogaster are parasitic in the rectal glands of various holocephalan fishes. They are characterized by a row of rugae, numerous testes, and two caeca, whilst other aspidogastrid species generally have one caecum and one or two testes.

References

Aspidogastrea
Trematode families
Trematodes parasiting fish